Donald Raleigh (born October 9, 1965) is an American politician and businessman serving as a member of the Minnesota House of Representatives from the 38A district. Elected in November 2020, he assumed office on January 5, 2021.

Education 
Raleigh graduated from Osceola High School in Polk County, Wisconsin in 1984. He earned a Bachelor of Arts degree in emergency and disaster management from American Military University.

Career 
Raleigh served in the United States Army from 1984 to 1992, where he was a member of the 3rd U.S. Infantry Regiment. From 1992 to 1994, he worked as a salesman for InaCOMP, a technology company based in Southfield, Michigan. He was also a salesman for Entex Industries, Syntegra, Control Data, BT Group, and Creative Internet Solutions. He later worked as a consultant at Control Data. In 2002, he founded Evolve Systems, a marketing agency. Raleigh also owns MYGUN.com LLC and Monitoring Management Solutions, Inc.

Raleigh was elected to the Minnesota House of Representatives in November 2020 and assumed office on January 5, 2021.

On September 8, 2022, a Minnesota Reformer article revealed that Raleigh was on the membership roster of the Oath Keepers, a group designated by the Anti-Defamation League as an "anti-government extremist group." In an interview, Raleigh stated that he "disavows the group and its beliefs, and that he only signed up for a membership years ago as part of a project to conduct market research on organizations targeting veterans."

Personal life 
Raleigh and his wife, Marnie, have four children and live in Blaine, Minnesota.

Raleigh was detained at the Minneapolis/St. Paul Airport in 2016 while en route to Washington D.C. after a loaded gun was discovered in his carry-on luggage. Raleigh later entered a guilty plea after being charged with presenting a prohibited item at the security screening area.

Raleigh has been linked to a series of web comics authored “by Dan & Don” originally posted on the violent cartoons depicting the murder of various people by guns. The cartoons were originally posted on MYGUN.com. The dozens of illustrations show a stick figure shooting and murdering a variety of victims, including kids, people of color, a Girl Scout selling cookies, military members, environmentalists, a blind person, an overweight person, a Jehovah Witness and a DMV employee.  Donald Raleigh has never publicly addressed the cartoons, however, a MN Republican spokesperson denied the cartoons were drawn by Donald Raleigh and asserted the drawings were by his younger brother, Dan.

References 

Living people
1965 births
People from Blaine, Minnesota
Republican Party members of the Minnesota House of Representatives